Eremophila ionantha is a flowering plant in the figwort family, Scrophulariaceae and is endemic to Western Australia. It is a shrub with many sticky branches, narrow, light green leaves and blue, purple or violet flowers.

Description
The branches are sticky due to the presence of resin and have many small, wart-like lumps and glandular hairs.

The flower buds are brown but when it opens the petal tube is pale lilac-coloured to violet on the outside and white to pale lilac inside. The outside surface of the petal tube is glabrous and often shiny but the middle part of the lower petal lobe and the inside of the petal tube are covered with matted hairs. The 4 stamens are fully enclosed in the petal tube. Flowering occurs from late September to February and is followed by hairy, woody, oval-shaped or cone-shaped fruits with a pointed end.

Taxonomy and naming 
Eremophila ionantha  was first formally described in 1905 by Ludwig Diels and Ernst Georg Pritzel and the description was published in Botanische Jahrbücher für Systematik, Pflanzengeschichte und Pflanzengeographie. The specific epithet (ionantha) is derived from Ancient Greek adjective, ion, meaning "violet", and the noun, anthos, meaning "flower".

Distribution and habitat
E. ionantha grows in Eucalyptus woodland between Merredin and Balladonia in the Avon Wheatbelt, Coolgardie, Esperance Plains, Mallee and Murchison biogeographic regions.

Conservation status
This species is classified as "not threatened" by the Western Australian Government Department of Parks and Wildlife.

Use in horticulture
This eremophila is a hardy plant needing little maintenance and is long lived - garden specimens of this species have been known to survive for more than 40 years. It is a medium-sized shrub with attractive blue to purple flowers. It can be propagated easily from cuttings taken at any time of the year and will grow in most soils, including heavy clay. It will grow in full sun or heavy shade, is both drought and frost tolerant, is tolerant of windy conditions and useful as a low-density windbreak.

References

Eudicots of Western Australia
ionantha
Endemic flora of Western Australia
Plants described in 1905
Taxa named by Ludwig Diels
Taxa named by Ernst Pritzel